Manirul Islam Monir (born 1 March 1952) is a Bangladesh Awami League politician and the former Member of Parliament of Barisal-2.

Early life 
Manirul was born on 1 March 1952. His father Rafiqul Islam was the president of Barisal District NAP and a professor of Bangla and Philosophy in BM College. Mother Mahmuda Rafiq was a poet, writer and teacher. He and his brothers Zahidul Islam Mahmud Jami and Maidul Islam Chuni played a heroic role in the great liberation war in Sector 9. His sister Nargis Rafika Rahman was a journalist.

Career 
Monirul Islam Moni is a freedom fighter and leader of Bangladesh Awami League. He was the joint secretary general of the Jatiya Party and the founding president of the Jatiya Swechchhasebak Party.

He was elected as a Member of Parliament from the then Pirojpur-2 constituency as a candidate of Jatiya Party in the 3rd Jatiya Sangsad elections on 7 May 1986. He was elected as a Member of Parliament from Pirojpur constituency along with the then Barisal as a candidate of Jatiya Party in the 4th Jatiya Sangsad elections on 3 March 1988. At that time he was the chairman of Milk Vita.

He was elected to parliament from Barisal-2 as a Bangladesh Awami League candidate in 2008.

References

Awami League politicians
Living people
9th Jatiya Sangsad members
People from Barisal District
1952 births
3rd Jatiya Sangsad members
4th Jatiya Sangsad members
Mukti Bahini personnel